Defensor Zarumilla is a Peruvian football club, playing in the city of Nazca, Ica, Peru.

History
In the 2010 Copa Perú, the club classified to Departamental Stage, but was eliminated by Sport Victoria in the Semifinals.

In the 2011 Copa Perú, the club classified to National Stage, but was eliminated by ADT in the Round of 16.

In the 2013 Copa Perú, the club classified to Regional Stage, but was eliminated by Deportivo Municipal (Paucará) and Deportivo Municipal (Santillana) in the Group Stage.

In the 2014 Copa Perú, the club classified to National Stage, but was eliminated by Unión Pichanaki in the Quarterfinals.

In the 2015 Copa Perú, the club classified to Provincial Stage, but was eliminated by Juventud Santa Fe in the Second Stage.

In the 2016 Copa Perú, the club classified to Departamental Stage, but was eliminated by Carlos Orellana in the Quarterfinals.

In the 2019 Copa Perú, the club classified to Departamental Stage, but was eliminated by Octavio Espinosa in the Semifinals.

Honours

Regional
Región VI:
Winners (2): 2011, 2014
Runner-up (1): 2012

Liga Departamental de Ica:
Winners (3): 2011, 2013, 2014

Liga Provincial de Nasca:
Winners (5): 1991, 2009, 2010, 2011, 2014

Liga Distrital de Nasca:
Winners (5): 1991, 2009, 2010, 2011, 2014

See also
List of football clubs in Peru
Peruvian football league system

References

External links
Zarumilla campeón

Football clubs in Peru
Association football clubs established in 1942